Dąbrówka Wielka may refer to the following places:
Dąbrówka Wielka, Łódź Voivodeship (central Poland)
Dąbrówka Wielka, Pomeranian Voivodeship (north Poland)
Dąbrówka Wielka, Warmian-Masurian Voivodeship (north Poland)